Walter Schultheiss (born 25 May 1924) is a German actor, author and painter.

Life and career 
He began his career in 1947 as Pedro del Vegas in the operetta Maske in Blau. He became famous from 1963 through his street sweeper skits at the former Süddeutscher Rundfunk, in which he and Werner Veidt entertained radio listeners every Saturday for 20 years: as the street sweeper duo Karle and Gottlob. He was heard and seen in other sketches and radio plays with Oscar Heiler, Oscar Müller, Willy Seiler, Georg Thomalla and Willy Reichert.

Schultheiss was involved in television films and family series such as Oh God, Herr Pfarrer, Der König von Bärenbach, as the pious parish councilor Karl Engstinger in Pfarrerin Lenau and as the winery owner Der Eugen. Even in old age, Schultheiss was still regularly on the theater stage for several weeks a year in the comedy im Marquardt in Stuttgart. From 2000 to 2007 he played the supporting role of the upper-class landlord Rominger in the SWR crime scene in Stuttgart (Ernst Bienzle). In 2009 he took part in the Swabian mini-series Laible und Frisch. In addition to acting, Schultheiss writes humorous dialogues, poems and valentines.

Personal life 
On May 25, 1950, Schultheiss married actress Trudel Wulle (1925–2021); In 1955 their son was born. The couple lived in Wildberg.

Filmography 

 1964–1966: Schwäbische Geschichten
 1975: Des Christoffel von Grimmelshausen abenteuerlicher Simplizissimus
 1977: Tatort: Himmelblau mit Silberstreifen
 1979: Das tausendunderste Jahr
 1981/82: Augsburger Puppenkiste – Hippo und der Süßwasserkarl (Stimme von Hippo)
 1983: Köberle kommt
 1983: Tatort: Mord ist kein Geschäft
 1984: Augsburger Puppenkiste – Das Tanzbärenmärchen (Stimme von Atta Troll)
 1985: Die Schwarzwaldklinik – Die Wunderquelle
 1986–1990: Der Eugen
 1988: Oh Gott, Herr Pfarrer
 1990: Pfarrerin Lenau
 1991: Tassilo – Ein Fall für sich
 1992: Der König von Bärenbach
 1994–1998: Hallo, Onkel Doc!, Folgen 1–75 als Albert Kampmann
 1995: Drei Tage im April
 1995: Tatort: Bienzle und der Mord im Park
 1996: Reise nach Weimar
 2000–2007: Tatort (Fernsehreihe)
 2006: Ein Fall für B.A.R.Z. (2. Staffel, 13 Folgen)
 2007: Ein Fall für B.A.R.Z. (3. Staffel, 13 Folgen)
 2008: Der Heckenschütze
 2008–2012: Der Schwarzwaldhof (Fernsehfilm-Reihe)
 2009/2010: Laible und Frisch – Liebe, Brot & Machenschaften
 2013: Global Player – Wo wir sind isch vorne

References 

1924 births
Living people
20th-century German actors
21st-century German actors
German television actors
German stage actors
People from Tübingen
German writers